Sukman Suaib (born June 27, 1983) is an Indonesian footballer who plays for PSAP Sigli in the Indonesia Super League.

Club statistics

References

External links

1983 births
Association football midfielders
Living people
Indonesian footballers
Liga 1 (Indonesia) players
PSAP Sigli players
Indonesian Premier Division players